Clementina Mulenga, better known as Cleo or Cleo Ice Queen, is a Zambian-born hip-hop recording artist, television, and radio presenter. She has gained recognition for her work as a Proflight Zambia brand ambassadorr and a Maximum Diva Woman Condom brand ambassador.

Cleo rose to prominence in 2013 when she participated in the eighth season of the reality television series Big Brother Africa, known as The Chase. She is also known for her musical talents and has won several awards, including the 2015 AFRIMMA Best Female in Southern Africa and the 2017 Best Female in the SunFm Kwacha Music Awards.

Cleo's moniker "Ice Queen" originates from her love for jeweller, which is commonly referred to as "ice" in hip hop slang. In addition to her musical and brand ambassador work, Cleo has been featured in various publications. She was the cover story for the March 2014 issue of the Nigerian magazine VL! Magazine.

Early life and career
Born on June 14, 1989, Cleo grew up in a family of five with two brothers and two sisters. Her passion for hip hop music started at the young age of six, and by the time she was 11 years old, she had already begun her singing career. Cleo's interest in the entertainment industry was evident from a very young age, as she used to perform at her own parties starting from her fourth birthday.

At Banani International School, where the principal had built a recording studio, Cleo had her first studio experience. At the age of 16, she recorded and released her first single "Hands Up."

Professional music
In 2011, Cleo started her music career, and the following year, she released a single titled "Big Dreams," featuring JK, which became a nationwide hit. She was also featured in the official remix of Khuli Chana's "Tswa Daar" song, which featured other popular African artists like Ice Prince, Maggz, Navio, AKA, and Reason. Cleo's debut album, "Geminice," was released in December 2016. The album has 14 songs, and the theme is inspired by her Gemini star sign. One part of the album comprises seven sentimental and lyrical songs, while the other seven songs are fun-loving and upbeat, including party anthems like the Urban Hype-featured "Turn Up," "Addicted," and "Autobahn."

In December 2016, Cleo released another single titled "Soldier," produced by Kekero. The song talks about the appreciation of an African man, which was Cleo's inspiration. On September 22, 2016, Cleo was the first Zambian artist to be selected for Season 2 of Coke Studio, a popular music television series in Africa. Together with Bucie and Mr Kamera, she created the song "Simunye" ("We are one"), which was a massive hit. The song celebrates African unity and oneness with a mix of Cleo's native tongue, Nyanja, and South African native tongue, Xhosa. It showcases how music has no language barriers.

Television
In 2013 Mulenga gained national recognition as a participant in the eighth season of the reality television series Big Brother Africa, which was produced by Endemol for M-Net. The show, which began on 26 May 2013, ran for 91 days and concluded on 25 August 2013. Mulenga spent the entirety of the season in the Big Brother house and emerged as the runner-up to Dillish Mathews, who won the 2013 season.

In 2015, Mulenga was chosen to host Bola Yapa Zed, a SuperSport football magazine show that exclusively focuses on Zambian football. The show is dedicated to bringing fans up-to-date information on all aspects of Zambian football, including news, interviews, and highlights. As the presenter of Bola Yapa Zed, Mulenga has become a well-known figure in the Zambian sports community.

Coke Studio
On 22 September 2016, Cleo made history as the first Zambian artist to participate in Season 2 of Coke Studio, a popular music television series in Africa that gives artists the opportunity to create new and innovative music. Cleo, also known as the "lady of rap," collaborated with Bucie, the "lady of house music," as well as super producer Mr Kamera, singer-songwriter Les-Ego, and master sound engineer Wilson. Together, they created the chart-topping hit, "Simunye" ("We are one"), which celebrates African royalty, unity, and oneness. The song features elements of Cleo's native Zambian language, Nyanja, as well as South African native tongue, Xhosa, and demonstrates the universality of music by transcending language barriers.

African Hip-Hop Awards
On 21 May 2017 Cleo was a special guest at the official launch of the African Hip Hop Awards 1 July at Chez Intemba in Lusaka.

Personal life

Relationships 
Cleo Ice Queen is Married to Kaladoshas.

Awards and nominations

External links
 Cleo On Twitter

References

Zambian television personalities
Living people
21st-century Zambian women singers
1989 births
People from Lusaka
Zambian television people